Edward Radclyffe may refer to:

 Edward Radclyffe, 6th Earl of Sussex (c. 1559–1643), MP for Petersfield, Bedfordshire and Portsmouth
 Edward Radclyffe, 2nd Earl of Derwentwater  (1655–1705), also MP for Petersfield, Bedfordshire and Portsmouth
 Edward Radclyffe (1809–1863), British engraver

See also
Edward Radcliffe-Nash, British horse rider